The 1972–73 Boston Celtics season was their 27th in the National Basketball Association (NBA). The Celtics finished the season with the best record in the league, and currently in franchise history, at 68–14. Third-year center Dave Cowens won the NBA Most Valuable Player Award ahead of Kareem Abdul-Jabbar and Tiny Archibald. They also won the Atlantic Division for the second consecutive season.

In the Eastern Conference Finals, the Celtics lost to the eventual NBA champion New York Knicks.

Draft picks

Roster

Regular season

Season standings

Record vs. opponents

Game log

Playoffs

|- align="center" bgcolor="#ccffcc"
| 1
| April 1
| Atlanta
| W 134–109
| John Havlicek (54)
| Dave Cowens (17)
| Art Williams (12)
| Boston Garden11,907
| 1–0
|- align="center" bgcolor="#ccffcc"
| 2
| April 4
| @ Atlanta
| W 126–113
| John Havlicek (29)
| Dave Cowens (25)
| Jo Jo White (11)
| Omni Coliseum11,588
| 2–0
|- align="center" bgcolor="#ffcccc"
| 3
| April 6
| Atlanta
| L 105–118
| Jo Jo White (23)
| Dave Cowens (18)
| Jo Jo White (10)
| Boston Garden15,320
| 2–1
|- align="center" bgcolor="#ffcccc"
| 4
| April 8
| @ Atlanta
| L 94–97
| John Havlicek (21)
| Paul Silas (22)
| John Havlicek (5)
| Omni Coliseum11,675
| 2–2
|- align="center" bgcolor="#ccffcc"
| 5
| April 11
| Atlanta
| W 108–101
| John Havlicek (32)
| Dave Cowens (20)
| John Havlicek (11)
| Boston Garden12,525
| 3–2
|- align="center" bgcolor="#ccffcc"
| 6
| April 13
| @ Atlanta
| W 121–103
| Jo Jo White (33)
| Paul Silas (17)
| Jo Jo White (7)
| Omni Coliseum16,181
| 4–2
|-

|- align="center" bgcolor="#ccffcc"
| 1
| April 15
| New York
| W 134–108
| Jo Jo White (30)
| Dave Cowens (15)
| John Havlicek (11)
| Boston Garden15,320
| 1–0
|- align="center" bgcolor="#ffcccc"
| 2
| April 18
| @ New York
| L 96–129
| John Havlicek (21)
| Dave Cowens (13)
| John Havlicek (11)
| Madison Square Garden19,694
| 1–1
|- align="center" bgcolor="#ffcccc"
| 3
| April 20
| New York
| L 91–98
| John Havlicek (29)
| Paul Silas (14)
| John Havlicek (6)
| Boston Garden15,320
| 1–2
|- align="center" bgcolor="#ffcccc"
| 4
| April 22
| @ New York
| L 110–117 (2OT)
| Jo Jo White (34)
| Paul Silas (23)
| Jo Jo White (6)
| Madison Square Garden19,694
| 1–3
|- align="center" bgcolor="#ccffcc"
| 5
| April 25
| New York
| W 98–97
| Dave Cowens (32)
| Paul Silas (20)
| Jo Jo White (7)
| Boston Garden15,320
| 2–3
|- align="center" bgcolor="#ccffcc"
| 6
| April 27
| @ New York
| W 110–100
| Dave Cowens (26)
| Dave Cowens (14)
| Jo Jo White (7)
| Madison Square Garden19,694
| 3–3
|- align="center" bgcolor="#ffcccc"
| 7
| April 29
| New York
| L 78–94
| Dave Cowens (24)
| Paul Silas (16)
| Dave Cowens (5)
| Boston Garden15,320
| 3–4
|-

Awards, records and milestones
 Most Valuable Player: Dave Cowens, Boston Celtics
 Coach of the Year: Tom Heinsohn, Boston Celtics
 All-NBA First Team:
 John Havlicek, Boston Celtics
 NBA All-Defensive Team:
 First Team:
 John Havlicek, Boston Celtics
 Second Team:
 Paul Silas, Boston Celtics
 Don Chaney, Boston Celtics

References

 Celtics on Database Basketball
 Celtics on Basketball Reference

Boston Celtics
Boston Celtics seasons
Boston Celtics
Boston Celtics
Celtics
Celtics